Ingrid Tanqueray (born 25 August 1988) is a French basketball player for Basket Lattes and the French national team, where she participated at the 2014 FIBA World Championship.

References

1988 births
Living people
French women's basketball players
Guards (basketball)